Cabell v. Chavez-Salido, 454 U.S. 432 (1982), was a case decided by the Supreme Court of the United States that upheld a state law as constitutional that excluded aliens from positions as probation officers.  The Court found that probation officers fell within the political function exception to strict scrutiny equal protection analysis because probation officers exercise discretionary power involving a basic governmental function that gives them authority over the individual.

See also
List of United States Supreme Court cases, volume 454

References

External links
 
 

United States equal protection case law
United States Supreme Court cases
United States Supreme Court cases of the Burger Court
1982 in United States case law